Samppa Lajunen (born 23 April 1979 in Turku) is a retired Finnish Nordic combined athlete who competed during the late 1990s and early 2000s.

Athletic career
A winner of five Winter Olympic Games medals, his career highlight came at the 2002 Winter Olympics in Salt Lake City when Lajunen won all three gold medals in the Nordic combined events. He also won silver medals at the 1998 Winter Olympics in Nagano in both the 15 km individual and 4 × 5 km team events.

Lajunen also found success at the FIS Nordic World Ski Championships, winning eight medals. This included one gold (4 × 5 km team: 1999), four silvers (15 km individual: 1999, 2001; 4 × 5 km team: 1997, 7.5 km sprint: 2001); and three bronzes (15 km individual: 2003, 4 × 5 km team: 2001, 2003)

Lajunen ended his career after the season 2003/2004 at a quite early age, 24 years old, and concentrated on his studies at the University of Jyväskylä. In the spring of 2007 he graduated with a Master's degree in Economics and Business Administration.

References
 

1979 births
Living people
Finnish male Nordic combined skiers
Olympic gold medalists for Finland
Olympic silver medalists for Finland
Nordic combined skiers at the 1998 Winter Olympics
Nordic combined skiers at the 2002 Winter Olympics
Sportspeople from Turku
FIS Nordic Combined World Cup winners
Nordic combined Grand Prix winners
University of Jyväskylä alumni
Olympic medalists in Nordic combined
FIS Nordic World Ski Championships medalists in Nordic combined
Medalists at the 2002 Winter Olympics
Medalists at the 1998 Winter Olympics